The  United National Liberation Front of Western South East Asia (UNLFW) is a united front of armed separatist groups in India formed by the United Liberation Front of Assam, the National Socialist Council of Nagaland, the Kamtapur Liberation Organisation, and the National Democratic Front of Boroland. It has claimed responsibility for the ambush of eighteen Indian soldiers in Manipur in one of the deadliest attacks against Indian security forces in over thirty years.

See also
Insurgency in Northeast India
Internal conflict in Burma
Insurgency in Jammu and Kashmir

References

2015 establishments in India
Insurgency in Northeast India
Left-wing militant groups in India
National liberation armies
Northeast India
Organizations established in 2015
Rebel groups in India
Separatism in India